Méabh De Búrca (born 11 August 1988) is an Irish footballer who plays for the Republic of Ireland women's national football team and Women's National League club Galway. At club level she previously played in America for Boston Aztec, in Norway for Amazon Grimstad and for Swedish club Eskilstuna United. De Búrca can play in defence or midfield.

Club career
 De Búrca joined Salthill Devon in 2000, initially playing in the boys' team. She progressed through the ranks alongside Niamh Fahey, and the pair helped Galway win the 2007 FAI Women's Cup. While Fahey departed to Arsenal Ladies, De Búrca stayed in Ireland and represented Galway in the 2008–09 UEFA Women's Cup.

In 2009 De Búrca moved to the University of New Haven on a soccer scholarship. In the 2011 season she also played for Boston Aztec, the Boston Breakers' reserve team, who compete at WPSL level. De Búrca made 13 appearances as Aztec won their conference and reached the national semi–final.

After graduating with a Master's degree in Sports Management, De Búrca signed a professional contract to play the 2012 season with Norwegian club Amazon Grimstad.

De Búrca spent the 2013 season playing for Eskilstuna United alongside compatriot Louise Quinn. The team won the Elitettan and promotion into the Damallsvenskan. In December 2013 De Búrca signed for new Women's National League entrant Galway W.F.C.

International career
De Búrca has won over 50 caps for Ireland, having previously represented her country at Under–17 level and as captain of the Under–19 team. Her full international debut came in a 1–0 defeat to Italy at Richmond Park in September 2006.

In 2007, while a student at NUI Galway, De Búrca played for Irish Universities at the 2007 Summer Universiade in Bangkok.

References

External links

1988 births
Living people
Republic of Ireland women's association footballers
People from Galway (city)
Association footballers from County Galway
Republic of Ireland women's international footballers
Expatriate women's soccer players in the United States
Women's association football defenders
Eskilstuna United DFF players
Salthill Devon F.C. players
Amazon Grimstad players
Women's National League (Ireland) players
Galway W.F.C. players
Expatriate women's footballers in Sweden
Expatriate women's footballers in Norway
Toppserien players
Irish expatriate sportspeople in Norway
Irish expatriate sportspeople in Sweden
Women's Premier Soccer League players
Boston Aztec (WPSL) players
Republic of Ireland women's youth international footballers
Elitettan players